William the Great may refer to:
William V of Aquitaine (969–1030)
William I, Count of Burgundy (1020–1087)
William of Maleval (died 1157)
William I, German Emperor (1797–1888), nicknamed Wilhelm the Great during the reign of his grandson Wilhelm II